Presents is the ninth studio album by Japanese J-pop singer and songwriter Maki Ohguro. It was released on 11 December 2002 under EMI Japan.

This album doesn't consist of any singles, instead it became a conceptual album about theme "love". Compared to the other albums, the music on the album sounds less pop-rock and carries calmer and jazzy feeling.

Takeshi Hayama, main producer of her albums since debut, wasn't involved in the production of this album. Satoshi Takebe, the member of the band Kokua is the main producer of this album with many other music arrangers from Universal Music Japan as well.

The album reached No. 18 in its first week on the Oricon chart. The album sold 28,000 copies.

Track listing

In media
3-Call & 1-Mail: commercial song of NTT DoCoMo
Ai no Uta: theme song for the Toyota Stadium

References

Universal Music Japan albums
Japanese-language albums
2002 albums
Maki Ohguro albums